According to the DHS S&T website , the Command, Control, and Interoperability Division was a unit of the DHS Science and Technology Directorate which "develops interoperable communication standards and protocols for emergency responders, cyber security tools for protecting the integrity of the Internet, and automated capabilities to recognize and analyze potential threats."

The division is currently led by Dr. David Boyd.  It is supervised by the Under Secretary of Homeland Security for Science and Technology, currently being Jay M. Cohen.

The 2007 High Priority Technical Needs Brochure  published by Homeland Security defines critical focus areas for Command, Control, and Interoperability research, falling primarily under the category of "cyber security":

 Secure internet protocols including standard security methods
 Improved capability to model the effects of cyber attacks and understanding of internet topography
 Comprehensive next-generation network models
 Composable and scalable secure systems
 Technologies and standards for managing identities, rights and authorities used in an organization's networks
 Information system insider threat detection models and mitigation technologies
 Analytical techniques for security across the IT system engineering lifecycle
 Process Control Systems (PCS) security

"information sharing":

 Data fusion from multiple sensors into Common Operating Picture (COP)
 Improved real-time data sharing of law enforcement information
 Management of user identities, rights and authorities
 Distribution of Intelligence Products
 Information sharing within/across sectors on terrorist threats
 Automated, dynamic, real-time data processing and visualization capability
 Analytic capabilities for structured, unstructured, and streaming data
 Situational awareness between US Coast Guard and partners
 Sensor fusion between Law Enforcement and Intelligence Partners

"border security":

 Ability to access ICE databases in which voice information is entered;provide analytical, reporting, and automated case deconfliction; classify, identify voice samples

"infrastructure protection":

 Advanced, automated and affordable monitoring and surveillance technologies

and "interoperability":

 Development and evaluation of Internet Protocol (IP) enabled backbones
 Test and evaluation of emergent wireless broadband data systems
 Acceleration of development and testing of P25 IP-based interfaces
 Identification and development of message interface standards
 Transition of Land Mobile Radios communication architectures to cellular based architectures
 Evaluation of access technologies
 Development of the complementary test procedures

Science And Technology Command
Water transportation in the United States